Bheemaram is a village and mandal of the Mancherial District of Telangana State. It is previously under the jaipur Mandal, but after new district formation in Telangana State, this was declared as a new mandal for the Mancherial District.

Administrative divisions
There are 12 Villages in this Mandal.

References 

Villages in Mancherial district
Mandal headquarters in Mancherial district